Spark Arena, known as Vector Arena until 2017, has been the busiest arena in New Zealand since its opening in 2007. Many local, regional and international artists have staged their performance at the venue, spanning a wide range of musical genre. Non-concert entertainment events are also included below and all events are arranged in a chronological order according to years.

2007

2008

2009

2010

2011

2012

2013

2014

2015

2016

2017

2018

2019

2020

2022

2023

References 

Entertainment events in New Zealand
Events in Auckland
Lists of events by venue
Lists of events in New Zealand
Entertainment events at Spark Arena